Florida Taxwatch is an independent, nonpartisan, nonprofit taxpayer research institute located in Tallahassee, Florida. Founded in 1979 as the Citizens Council for Budget Research, Florida TaxWatch conducts research that aims to improve government efficiency and accountability. Florida TaxWatch is a 501(c)(3) tax-exempt non-profit educational and research organization. Since 1982, the organization has been led by President and CEO Dominic M. Calabro.

Florida TaxWatch has six Centers of Excellence, each with their own legislative and policy priorities. The six Centers include the Center for Health and Aging, the Center for Educational Performance and Accountability, the Center for Government Efficiency, the Center for Florida Citizenship, the Center for Smart Justice, and the Center for Competitive Florida. The group is best known for its annual Budget Turkey report.

History

In 1977, incoming Florida Senate President Phil Lewis approached Mark Hollis, then Vice President of Publix Super Markets, about the business community coming to the Florida Legislature to seek increases in consumer taxes rather than finding ways to hold the line on spending. Following this discussion, the two decided that a state government watchdog was needed.

An organizational meeting convened in Tampa two years later resulted in the formation of the Citizens Council for Budget Research, which five years later was renamed Florida TaxWatch. The founders were Winn-Dixie Chairman J.E. Davis, T. Wayne Davis, Publix Super Markets founder George Jenkins and President Mark Hollis, and Florida State Senator Phil Lewis and Florida State Senator Ken Plante.

Florida TaxWatch is currently located in the former St. James Christian Methodist Episcopal church. Built in 1899, the church was constructed on land purchased by black members of the Trinity Methodist Episcopal Church and was, at one point, the oldest African-American church in Tallahassee.

Activities

Publications

Florida TaxWatch publishes various research reports, briefings, and periodicals. Notable publications include its annual Budget Turkey report, a monthly Economic Commentary, and a monthly Budget Watch.

Events

Florida TaxWatch holds various events throughout the year including:

 The Prudential Productivity Awards, which celebrates innovative state employees who increase productivity and accountability within state government agencies.
 The Principal Leadership Awards, which honors Florida principals at at-risk schools that have made significant learning gains.
 Annual Board Meetings in Spring and Fall
 The State of the Taxpayer Dinner, which is an annual dinner event at the beginning of the Florida Legislative Session.
 Telehealth Cornerstone Conference, which seeks to educate business and community leaders about the advantages of expanding telehealth in the state of Florida.

Officers of the Florida TaxWatch Board of Trustees
As of December 2016:

 David Mann, Chairman of Florida TaxWatch, CEO - North Florida, SunTrust Banks
 Dominic M. Calabro, President and CEO of Florida TaxWatch
 Senator Pat Neal, Chairman-Elect of Florida TaxWatch, former Florida State Senator, CEO, Neal Communities
 Senator George LeMieux, Treasurer of Florida TaxWatch, former United States Senator, Chairman of the Board of Directors and Shareholder, Gunster Law Firm
 Piyush Patel, Secretary of Florida TaxWatch, Founder and CEO of Kyra Solutions, Inc.
 Michelle A. Robinson, Immediate Past Chairman of Florida TaxWatch, President - Southeast Region, Verizon

Controversies
Despite claims of non-partisanship, Florida TaxWatch policy positions have been described in the media as consistent with conservative fiscal policy. As a business-backed policy group, some of the watchdog groups' proposals have generated controversy, including selling advertisements on state government-owned road signs, eliminating the traditional pension plan and deferred retirement options for public employees, and increasing requirements for state-backed scholarship programs to reduce eligibility.

Notes

External links
 

Organizations based in Tallahassee, Florida